The Shire of Esk was a local government area in South East Queensland, Australia, located about  west - northwest of Brisbane. It stretched from the Lockyer Valley north and west to the Great Dividing Range and up the valley of the Brisbane River.

History

The Durundur Division was incorporated on 11 November 1879 under the Divisional Boards Act 1879 with a population of 1428. Its name was changed to Esk Division on 2 June 1880 by proclamation.

On 18 January 1884, there was an adjustment of boundaries between Highfields Division's subdivisions Nos. 1 and 2 and Esk Division.

With the passage of the Local Authorities Act 1902, Esk became a Shire on 31 March 1903. The council consisted of an elected mayor and ten councillors, and was not subdivided.

In 1980, the Council of the Shire of Esk adopted the head of the red deer as its logo, honouring a gift from Queen Victoria in September 1873 to the district. In 1984 the official logo was adopted. The Weeping Bottlebrush was adopted as the shire's floral emblem on 10 August 1994.

On 15 March 2008, under the Local Government (Reform Implementation) Act 2007 passed by the Parliament of Queensland on 10 August 2007, the Shire of Esk merged with the Shire of Kilcoy to form the Somerset Region.

Towns and localities
The Shire of Esk included the following settlements:

 Esk
 Borallon
 Caboonbah
 Clarendon
 Colinton
 Coolana
 Coominya
 Dundas
 Fairney View
 Fernvale
 Glamorgan Vale
 Harlin
 Lake Somerset
 Lake Wivenhoe

 Lark Hill
 Linville
 Lowood
 Minden
 Moore
 Mount Hallen
 Mount Tarampa
 Prenzlau
 Rifle Range
 Tarampa
 Toogoolawah
 Vernor
 Wanora

Population

Chairmen and Mayors
March 1880 - December 1885: Frederick Lord 
 January 1886 - March 1888: James Henry McConnel 
 March 1888 - February 1889: Frederick Lord 
 February 1889 - February 1891: Thomas Pryde 
 February 1891 - February 1893: Frederick Lord 
 February 1893 - February 1894: George Charles Taylor
 February 1894 - February 1896: Patrick Clifford 
 February 1896 - February 1899: James Henry McConnel 
 March 1899 - February 1901: Walter Francis 
 March 1901 - January 1902: Henry Plantagenet Somerset
 February 1902 - February 1905: Walter Francis 
 March 1905 - February 1906: Alexander Smith 
 February 1906 - February 1907: Charles Stuart Lord (son of Frederick Lord) 
 February 1907 - February 1908: Frederick Seib 
 February 1908 - February 1909: John MacDonald 
 February 1909 - February 1910: Alexander Smith 
 February 1910 - February 1911: Charles George Handley 
 February 1911 - February 1912: Alexander Smith 
 March 1913 - May 1914: James Henry McConnel 
 May 1914 - July 1914: Alexander Smith 
 July 1914 - March 1915: Herbert Prescott Gardner 
 March 1915 - March 1916: Eric Walter McConnel 
 March 1916 - February 1917: Alexander Smith 
 February 1917 - January 1919: George Bishop 
 January 1919 - February 1920: William Roy Butler 
 February 1920 - August 1921: Michael Frederick Thompson 
 August 1921 - April 1930: Alexander Smith 
 April 1930 - August 1940: William Lewis 
 1940 - July 1952: James Barbour, junior 
 September 1952 - 1961: William Wells 
 1961 - 1967: Norman Joseph McInnes 
 1967 - September 1983: Kenneth Edgar Haslindgden 
 October 1983 - : Lester Joseph Williams 
 
 1991–2004: Jean Bray
 2004–2007: Graeme Lehmann; after amalgamation continued as Mayor of Somerset Region

References

Further reading

External links
 University of Queensland: Queensland Places: Esk Shire
 

Former local government areas of Queensland
1879 establishments in Australia
Somerset Region
2008 disestablishments in Australia
Populated places disestablished in 2008